Bruno Rodríguez (born 28 October 1986) is a Mexican former tennis player.

Rodríguez has a career high ATP singles ranking of 364 achieved on 17 May 2010. He also has a career high doubles ranking of 359 achieved on 24 September 2012.

He made his main draw debut on the ATP World Tour at the 2008 Abierto Mexicano Telcel in Acapulco as a wild card. He has been a member of the Mexico Davis Cup team between 2008 and 2012.

ATP Challenger and ITF Futures finals

Singles: 7 (1–6)

Doubles: 20 (7–13)

External links
 
 

1986 births
Living people
Mexican male tennis players
Central American and Caribbean Games medalists in tennis
Central American and Caribbean Games bronze medalists for Mexico